Mark Dwayne Ryal (born April 28, 1960) is an American former professional baseball player who played six seasons for the Kansas City Royals, Chicago White Sox, California Angels, Philadelphia Phillies, and Pittsburgh Pirates of the Major League Baseball (MLB). He also played two seasons in the Nippon Professional Baseball (NPB) for the Chunichi Dragons.  He is the father of Rusty Ryal, an infielder for the Arizona Diamondbacks.

Baseball career
Ryal attended Dewar High School and was selected in the third round (77th overall) by the Kansas City Royals in the June 1978 amateur Baseball draft.

As of 2021, Ryal is notable for, on September 4, 1987, being the most recent instance of a left-handed throwing fielder playing the position of shortstop in a Major League Baseball game. Ryal’s California Angels lost to the New York Yankees by a score of 8-4. Including Ryal, only five left-handed individuals have appeared at the position of shortstop in a Major League Baseball game since 1934, the feat occurring in a total of only 10 games, six of which by the same individual, Royle Stillman, in 1975.

See also
List of second-generation Major League Baseball players

External links

1960 births
Living people
American expatriate baseball players in Canada
American expatriate baseball players in Japan
Baseball players from Oklahoma
Buffalo Bisons (minor league) players
California Angels players
Chicago White Sox players
Chunichi Dragons players
Edmonton Trappers players
Fort Myers Royals players
Gulf Coast Royals players
Jacksonville Suns players
Kansas City Royals players
Kansas City Royals scouts
Louisville Redbirds players
Major League Baseball outfielders
Nippon Professional Baseball outfielders
Oklahoma City 89ers players
Omaha Royals players
People from Henryetta, Oklahoma
Philadelphia Phillies players
Pittsburgh Pirates players
Scranton/Wilkes-Barre Red Barons players